Sampford Spiney is a village and civil parish in the Walkham valley, about 4 miles east south east of Tavistock, in the West Devon district, in the county of Devon, England. In 2011 the parish had a population of 117. The parish touches Walkhampton, Whitchurch and Horrabridge.

Features 
There are 26 listed buildings in Sampford Spiney, of which the church is Grade I listed.

History 
Sampford Spiney was recorded in the Domesday Book as Sandford/Sandforda. The name "Sampford" means 'Sandy ford', with the "Spiney" part being a family name of which the Spiney family held Sampford Spiney in the 13th century. On the 1st of October 1950 Horrabridge became a separate parish, the transferred area contained 135 acres. The parish was historically in the Roborough hundred.

References

External links 

Villages in the Borough of West Devon